Libby is an unincorporated community in Libby Township, Aitkin County, Minnesota, United States. The community is located between McGregor and Jacobson along State Highway 65 (MN 65). The Mississippi River flows nearby. Libby is located immediately northwest of Big Sandy Lake.

Nearby places include Palisade, McGregor, Tamarack, Jacobson, Ball Bluff, and Savanna Portage State Park.

Libby is located 13 miles north of McGregor, and 16 miles south of Jacobson.

Aitkin Lake is located near Libby, stocked with black bullhead, black crappie, bluegill, brown bullhead, hybrid sunfish, largemouth bass, northern pike, pumpkinseed, tullibee (cisco), walleye, yellow bullhead, yellow perch, bowfin (dogfish), shorthead redhorse, white sucker, golden shiner and minnow.

The community had a post office from 1891 to 1953.

References

Unincorporated communities in Minnesota
Unincorporated communities in Aitkin County, Minnesota